The 2003 Dallas Cowboys season was the 44th season for the team in the National Football League (NFL). Coming off three consecutive 5–11 seasons, Dallas hired former New York Giants, New York Jets, and New England Patriots coach Bill Parcells. In a scheduling coincidence, the Cowboys faced all three said teams in the 2003 regular season.

Draft class 

Notes
 The Cowboys traded their 2002 seventh-round (No. 237 overall) and 2003 fifth-round (No. 140 overall) selections to the New England Patriots for a 2002 fifth-round (No. 168 overall) selection.
 The Cowboys traded their 2002 first-round (No. 6 overall) selection to the Kansas City Chiefs in exchange for 2002 first (No. 8 overall) and third-round (No. 75 overall) selections, and a 2003 sixth-round (No. 186 overall) selection.

Undrafted free agents

Roster

Regular season 
Despite the release of team legend Emmitt Smith, the Cowboys' fortunes began to change with the introduction of Parcells as head coach. Parcells began to reshape the team, particularly on offense, with an overhaul of the coaching staff, including former New York Giants offensive coordinator Sean Payton. Parcells retained much of the defensive staff, including defensive coordinator Mike Zimmer, and maintained the team's basic 4–3 defense instead of immediately installing the 3–4 defense which was a trademark of all Parcells's prior teams. This proved a wise decision, as the Cowboys finished the season with the top-ranked overall defense. As in his previous stops, Parcells started to rebuild his team through the draft. In his first year in Dallas, Parcells picked future Pro Bowl players cornerback Terence Newman, tight end Jason Witten and future Cowboys defensive captain linebacker Bradie James. One of the biggest rookie acquisitions came via free agency when the team signed undrafted rookie and future franchise quarterback Tony Romo (although that move got little attention for a few years). Also typical of his prior teams, Parcells brought in veteran players who had played for him at his previous coaching stops, signing fullback Richie Anderson and speedy wide receiver Terry Glenn with whom Parcells had a checkered history.

Though the Cowboys opened the season with a loss, a dramatic come-from-behind victory the next week against the Giants at New York spurred the team's confidence, particularly in third-year quarterback Quincy Carter. This was followed by a reunion with Emmitt Smith (now with the Arizona Cardinals) in Dallas. Smith injured his shoulder early in the game and did not return. After starting with a 7–2 record, the Cowboys went 3–4 in the second half of the season including a loss to the eventual Super Bowl champion New England Patriots in Foxboro. The game received a lot of hype due to Bill Parcells's and Patriots head coach Bill Belichick's seemingly strained relationship due to the events following their final season coaching together with the New York Jets. Though the Cowboys finished 10–6 and earned a playoff berth, they lost in the first round to the eventual NFC champions, the Carolina Panthers.

The Cowboys ranked first in total defense (253.5 yards per game), third in rushing defense, and second in scoring (16.3 points per game), which helped the team qualify for the playoffs for the first time in four years. In October, the Cowboys snapped a six-game losing streak to the Philadelphia Eagles (at halftime of the Eagles game, Tex Schramm was posthumously inducted into the club's Ring of Honor).

This turned out to be the final season for long-time (and often Pro Bowl) Cowboys safety Darren Woodson. Woodson represented the last player link to the Jimmy Johnson Cowboys (and to all three Super Bowl teams of the 1990s). Woodson was on the roster the following season (2004) but never saw action due to injury.

Schedule 

Note: Intra-division opponents are in bold text.

Game summaries

Week 1 vs. Atlanta Falcons 

The Parcells era of the Cowboys began inauspiciously in a 27–13 loss to the Falcons at Texas Stadium. With Michael Vick out with injury Doug Johnson started for the Falcons and had two passing touchdowns and a rushing score. Quincy Carter had a touchdown to Joey Galloway and an interception.

Week 2 at New York Giants 

On Monday Night Football Parcells returned to Giants Stadium for the first time since his final year as NY Jets coach and the ensuing game against the NY Giants became a memorable struggle. The Cowboys raced to a 23–7 lead as kicker Billy Cundiff proceeded through a huge day, but the Giants behind Kerry Collins erupted, outscoring the Cowboys 25–12 in the second half; the go-ahead Giants score (a 30-yard Matt Bryant field goal) came with eleven seconds left. A penalty on the ensuing kickoff gave Dallas the ball at its own 40 and a 26-yard catch by Antonio Bryant set up Cundiff's sixth field goal of the game, a 52-yarder with no time left. In overtime both teams traded punts before Quincy Carter led the Cowboys to the Giants 6-yard line and Cundiff connected on a seventh field goal and 35–32 win; in that process Cundiff tied Chris Boniol's record from Dallas' 1996 win over the Packers.

Week 4 at New York Jets 

Following their bye week the Cowboys returned to the Meadowlands, this time to face the Jets. The Cowboys rushed for 202 yards and Troy Hambrick and Antonio Bryant touchdowns in the second quarter were enough as the Cowboys won 17–6.

Week 5 vs. Arizona Cardinals 

The Cowboys hosted former NFC East foe Arizona; they limited the Cardinals to 151 total yards and sacked Jeff Blake twice in the endzone for a safety, ultimately winning 24–7. Quincy Carter had 277 yards and two touchdowns.  Former Cowboy Emmitt Smith was knocked out of the game after failing to record a single yard (he had a net loss of one yard) on six carries and later admitted “i cried for forty five minutes before the game.”

Week 6 vs. Philadelphia Eagles 

The Eagles opened with an onside kick and Randal Williams ran it back for a Dallas touchdown, and became the quickest player to score a touchdown in NFL history, in only 3 seconds. From there the Cowboys raced to a 17–7 lead in the third quarter. But by late in the fourth quarter Duce Staley's 52-yard catch from Donovan McNabb and a Correll Buckhalter score put the Eagles up 21–20. Quincy Carter then completed a 19-yard pass to Joey Galloway; two Troy Hambrick runs set up the go-ahead Cowboys field goal with 1:14 to go; the Cowboys then sacked McNabb and he fumbled to Dallas, ending the game as a 23–21 Dallas win.

Week 7 at Detroit Lions 

The Cowboys embarrassed the Lions by scoring the game's final 38 points, with a monster day for Quincy Carter and Terry Glenn, who both hooked up for three touchdowns; Mario Edwards then intercepted Joey Harrington and scored. In the end the Cowboys were 38–7 winners with a 5–1 record.

Week 8 at Tampa Bay Buccaneers 

The embattled Bucs shut out the Cowboys 16–0 as Keyshawn Johnson caught a touchdown pass while Quincy Carter was intercepted twice.

Week 9 vs. Washington Redskins

Week 10 vs. Buffalo Bills 

Bill Parcells faced his once and future quarterback Drew Bledsoe as the 4–4 Bills came to Dallas. Bledsoe managed just two drives ending in field goals while the Cowboys were only slightly better, managing a two-yard Quincy Carter touchdown for the 10–6 Cowboys win.

Week 11 at New England Patriots 

Parcells traveled to Foxboro for the first time since the 1999 season and faced his former assistant Bill Belichick on Sunday night. The Patriots had won five straight and made it six as they sacked Quincy Carter once and intercepted three passes. Former Patriot Terry Glenn was held to one catch as the Patriots ground out a 12–0 win.

Week 12 vs. Carolina Panthers 

The Cowboys hosted the surging Panthers and the game lead tied or changed six times. Joey Galloway caught a touchdown, one of two from Quincy Carter, while Aveion Cason's touchdown put Dallas up 24–17. John Kasay's field goal at 3:51 to go made it 24–20 late in the fourth, but the Cowboys killed the remaining clock on four Carter completions for 21 yards and a four-yard run aided by a Deon Grant personal foul penalty.

Thanksgiving Day vs. Miami Dolphins 

The 8–3 Cowboys hosted the 7–4 Dolphins for the first time since 1999. The two teams had clashed in memorable contests in 1993 and 1996 and both were in the thick of their playoff races. The second quarter became a frantic affair following a first quarter score by Jay Fiedler. The Dolphins erupted to outscore Dallas 23–14 in the second, and from there the game merely awaited its obsequies on two more Miami touchdowns (one a strip-sack of Quincy Carter run back by Jason Taylor) and a Carter score to Antonio Bryant. The Dolphins finished up 40–21 winners, and both teams faced key division matchups at 8–4.

Week 14 at Philadelphia Eagles 

The Eagles all but locked up the NFC East by crushing the Cowboys 36–10. They intercepted Quincy Carter twice and forced a fumble through the endzone for a safety. Donovan McNabb had three touchdown throws despite a failed fourth-down attempt in the fourth quarter, and Correll Buckhalter (144 combined yards from scrimmage) finished the game on a 64-yard touchdown run.

Week 15 at Washington Redskins 

On a dismal day for quarterbacking (Quincy Carter, Brian Barker, and Tim Hasselbeck combined for just 16 of 50 passes for 164 yards and a Carter touchdown for an average passer rating of just 75) Troy Hambrick exploded to 189 rushing yards as Dallas shut out the Skins 27–0.

Week 16 vs. New York Giants 

Carter got back in groove with 240 yards and a touchdown as four Billy Cundiff field goals (for an aggregate of eleven vs. the Giants in the season) aided a 19–3 Dallas win over the Giants. Dallas now stood in a three-way race for the NFC Wild Cards with the Seahawks and Green Bay Packers. However, because Dallas owned a tiebreaker with Green Bay by virtue of conference record in the event that the Cowboys lost and both the Packers and Vikings won (who were both vying for the NFC North in which the Vikings were leading at the time via a divisional tiebreaker), Dallas had clinched at playoff berth regardless of whether or not the Seahawks were involved in a tie with the Cowboys and Packers. In addition, the Cowboys still had an outside chance at winning the NFC East and a first-round bye with a win and an Eagles' loss the following week.

Week 17 at New Orleans Saints 

Entering their last game of the regular season, the Cowboys were aware that the Eagles had defeated the Redskins the previous day, rendering the final week of the regular season meaningful in deciding whether Dallas would finish as the #5 or #6 seed prior to a road wild-card playoff game. A win would lock Dallas into the #5 seed. The Saints were still smarting from a shocking series of laterals ending in a touchdown and missed PAT against Jacksonville the week before. They responded by intercepting Quincy Carter three times and shutting out the Cowboys the remaining two quarters for the 13–7 Saints win. The Seahawks' win the previous day and various results in the final week of the regular season dropped the Cowboys to the sixth seed in the NFC as Seattle held the strength of victory tiebreaker.

Standings

Postseason

Wild Card Playoff at Carolina Panthers 

For the first time since 1996 the Cowboys faced the Carolina Panthers in the postseason. It was also the first playoff game for Parcells since the 1998 AFC Championship Game. The result, though, was an ugly 29–10 curtain on the season as the Panthers forced a fumble, picked off Quincy Carter once, sacked him three times, and limited the Cowboys to 204 yards of offense. Carter accounted for roughly a third of Dallas' rushing production with 25 yards on the ground (one of them on a rushing touchdown, the only touchdown for Dallas in the game), but finished with a passer rating of 56.9, compared to the 104.5 put up by Panthers quarterback Jake Delhomme.

Publications 
 The Football Encyclopedia 
 Total Football 
 Cowboys Have Always Been My Heroes

References

External links 
 2003 Dallas Cowboys
 Pro Football Hall of Fame
 Dallas Cowboys Official Site

Dallas Cowboys seasons
Dallas
Dallas